Amer is a 2009 Belgian-French thriller horror film written and directed by Hélène Cattet and Bruno Forzani and starring Cassandra Forêt, Bianca Maria D'Amato, Charlotte Eugène Guibeaud, and Marie Bos. The film is a giallo in three parts. The plot of the film follows the sexual development of Ana who lives on the French Riviera. The film focuses on her oppressive teenage years leading to her womanhood. The film premiered in Sweden in 2009. It has received generally favorable reviews and was nominated for the Magritte Award for Best Film.

Plot

Cast
 Cassandra Forêt as Ana (child)
 Charlotte Eugène Guibeaud as Ana (teenager) - (credited as Charlotte Eugène Guibbaud)
 Marie Bos as Ana (adult)
 Delphine Brual as Graziella 
 Harry Cleven as Taximan
 Bianca Maria D'Amato as The Mother
 Bernard Marbaix as The dead grandfather
 Jean-Michel Vovk as The father

Production
To fund the film's production, Belgian producer Eve Commenge created a company to produce Amer. Directors Hélène Cattet and Bruno Forzani required more funding outside Belgium and searched for a French co-producer. Producer François Cognard agreed to co-produce the film.
The directors found that they only had one third of their original budget, but the producers let them start production regardless based on their experience of making short films for very little money.

The directors took great preparations before shooting the actors due to the film's low budget. All shots in the film were tested with digital video cameras with the two directors playing all the parts so that nothing unexpected would come up when they began filming with the other actors.
The film was shot at the French Riviera and in Belgium. It took 39 days to shoot.

Release
Amer had its world premiere at the 2009 Lund International Fantastic Film Festival in Sweden. The film won The Blade award which was the first time it was given at the festival. The film was shown at other film festivals as well, including the Sitges Film Festival in Spain where the directors won the award for Discovery Motion Picture Diploma.

Reception
Amer was received very well by American critics on its original release. The film ranking website Rotten Tomatoes reports a 79% approval rating, based on 29 reviews, with an average score of 6.84/10. At Metacritic, the film has received an average score of 72, based on seven reviews. The Village Voice gave the film a positive review, stating that "The pleasures of this gorgeous, clever, and visceral film are almost exclusively aesthetic" as well as "that those unmoved or alienated by the porn of pain may be left flopping as nervelessly as one of the movie's severed limbs." The Los Angeles Times referred to the film as "Consistently outrageous and relentlessly surreal, the Belgian film is, intentionally or not, frequently funny; it's also compelling and distinctive." Empire gave the film three out of five stars, recommending it for fans of Dario Argento.

References

External links
 
 

2009 films
2009 horror films
2000s horror thriller films
French horror thriller films
Belgian horror thriller films
Films set in France
Films shot in Belgium
Films shot in France
Giallo films
Films scored by Ennio Morricone
Films scored by Stelvio Cipriani
Films scored by Bruno Nicolai
2000s English-language films
2000s French films